Hulta is a borough of Borås, Västra Götaland, Sweden.

References

Borås